Purworejo is a town on the island of Java, Indonesia and the regency seat of Purworejo Regency, Central Java region. It is also the main town of the district of Purworejo.

Climate
Purworejo has a tropical monsoon climate (Am) with moderate to little rainfall from June to September and heavy to very heavy rainfall from October to May.

References

External links 
 

Regency seats of Central Java
Purworejo Regency